Andria is a city and comune in Apulia (southern Italy). It is an agricultural and service center, producing wine, olives and almonds. It is the fourth-largest municipality in the Apulia region (behind Bari, Taranto, and Foggia) and the largest municipality of the  Province of Barletta-Andria-Trani. It is known for the 13th-century Castel del Monte.

Geography 
Its municipality, the 16th per area in Italy, borders with Barletta, Canosa di Puglia, Corato, Minervino Murge, Ruvo di Puglia, Spinazzola and Trani.

History  

Different theories exist about the origins of Andria. In 915 it is mentioned as a "casale" ("hamlet") depending from Trani; it acquired the status of city around 1046, when the Norman count Peter enlarged and fortified the settlements in the area (including also Barletta, Corato and Bisceglie).

In the 14th century, under the Angevins, Andria became seat of a Duchy. In 1350 it was besieged by German and Lombard mercenaries of the Hungarian army, and in 1370 by the troops of Queen Joan I of Naples. In 1431 the ruler of Andria Francesco II Del Balzo found the mortal remains of Saint Richard of Andria, the current patron saint, and instituted the Fair of Andria (23–30 April). In 1487 the city was acquired by the Aragonese, the Duchy passing to the future King Frederick IV of Naples. Later (1552), it was sold by the Spanish to Fabrizio Carafa, for the sum of 100,000 ducats.

The Carafas ruled the city until 1799, when the French troops captured it after a long siege. After the Bourbon restoration, Andria was a protagonist of the Risorgimento and, after the unification of Italy, the brigandage era.

Main sights  

Andria was a favorite residence of Emperor Frederick II, who built the imposing 13th-century Castel del Monte about 15 km south of the city center; it is one of the most famous Italian castles, and was listed as a UNESCO World Heritage Site in 1996.

Other sights include:
 The 12th-century cathedral, which has a 7th-century crypt
 The Ducal Palace, a fortified residence renovated in the 16th century
San Domenico (14th century, largely renovated in the following centuries). Church contains a bust of Duke Francesco II Del Balzo attributed to Francesco Laurana, and a 16th-century wooden sculpture of the Madonna with Child.
Sant'Agostino, church built in the 13th century by the Teutonic Knights, who originally dedicated it to one of their patrons, Saint Leonard. The church was later handed over to the Benedictines, and rebuilt by the Augustinians after the sieges of 1350. The main points of interests are the Gothic-style gates, with precious reliefs and crests of the Del Balzo and Anjou families, as well as the Teutonic eagles.
San Francesco, church and monastery with its cloister (12th century)
 The Communal Palace
 Santa Maria dei Miracoli (16th century), Sanctuary basilica  from Andria, housing a venerated Byzantine icon from the 9th-10th centuries. The basilica is on three different levels. The lower, and most ancient, comprises a hall with a nave and two aisles, with decoration showing stories from Genesis. The middle level (Tempietto) has three arcades in polychrome marbles, and is home to the Byzantine icon. The upper level, the 18th century basilica designed by Cosimo Fanzago, is preceded by another church, dedicated to the Holy Crucifix and decorated with frescoes depicting the Passion of Christ.
San Nicola di Myra, 12th century church, with subsequent refurbishments
 The church of the Holy Cross (9th century). It has a nave and two aisles, separated by four pilasters. The crypt was dug in a tuff rock and includes some natural grottoes.
 The church of Santa Maria di Porta Santa (13th century).

Government

Transportation 
Andria is connected by the A14 National Motorway, and the SP 231 provincial road connecting it to Bari and Foggia.

Andria has a railway station in the Bari–Barletta railway, part of the Ferrovie del Nord Barese network managed by Ferrotramviaria. The nearest Trenitalia-FS (Italian national railroads) station is that of Barletta,  from Andria. On 12 July 2016, a head-on collision between two passenger trains occurred on the line south of Andria. At least 23 people were killed and dozens more injured.

Sport 
The most popular sport in town is football and the main team is Fidelis Andria. Its home stadium is Stadio Degli Ulivi.

Notable people 
 Peter I of Trani
 Conrad IV of Germany
 Isabella II of Jerusalem, buried in the Cathedral crypt
 Isabella of England, buried in the Cathedral crypt
 Farinelli
 Richard of Andria
 Vincenzo Carafa
 Ettore Carafa
 Corrado Ursi
 Lino Banfi
 Antonio Matarrese
 Tuccio D'Andria
 Riccardo Scamarcio
 Isabella del Balzo
 Antonia of Baux

International relations

Andria is twinned with:
 Alberobello, Italy
 Monte Sant'Angelo, Italy, since 2013

References

External links 

Official website  
Andria web portal  
 Map of Andria on Google Maps

 
Cities and towns in Apulia